Oliver Wines (born 7 October 1994) is a professional Australian rules footballer playing for the Port Adelaide Football Club in the Australian Football League (AFL). Wines received a nomination for the 2013 AFL Rising Star award in Round 1 of the 2013 season, his debut match. He served as Port Adelaide co-captain in the 2019 season. Wines' standout 2021 season earned him a Brownlow Medal with a record-tying 36 votes (a record shared with Dustin Martin's 2017 tally).

Early life
Wines played his junior football at the Echuca Football Club and for the Bendigo Pioneers in the TAC Cup before being drafted by Port Adelaide in the 2012 AFL Draft. Wines attended Goulburn Valley Grammar School, in Shepparton. Wines' great uncle was Clinton Wines, who played 39 games for  during the 1940s, including the 1945 VFL premiership. As a kid, Wines would often call into Rex Hunt's talk back radio show on 3AW where he would ask questions about Andrew Walker's statistics.

AFL career
Prior to the 2012 AFL draft, Wines was predicted to go to the Melbourne Football Club along with Jack Viney, his best friend who attended the same primary school at Echuca and was already a father–son selection pick with Melbourne. Instead, he was overlooked by Melbourne and was drafted by Port Adelaide with their first selection, pick seven, in the 2012 national draft. He made his AFL debut in the opening round of the 2013 AFL season at the Melbourne Cricket Ground against Melbourne, which also featured his best friend, Jack Viney. Port Adelaide won the game by 79 points. In an impressive debut, Wines finished the game with 24 disposals including 16 contested possessions and one goal, earning him the Round 1 nomination for the 2013 AFL Rising Star. He ended up finishing third in the Rising Star with 26 votes.

Wines had a strong season in 2014 with thoughts that he may have been subject to the second year blues dispelled in Round 1 as he achieved career bests in many categories in Round 1 against —twenty-eight disposals, two goals, and nine tackles. He played in every game for the club primarily as an inside midfielder. In the finals, he averaged twenty-three disposals and kicked five goals across three games. At season's end, he placed equal sixth in the club's best and fairest and won his second consecutive Gavin Wanganeen medal as Port's best player under 21.

After a stunning first two seasons, Wines' 2015 season was interrupted. He started the season strongly, averaging 28 disposals and a goal across the first two games before injuring his wrist in Round 2 against , sidelining him for a month. He received the three Brownlow Medal votes in both those games. Unfortunately for Wines, his season came to a premature end in Round 18 when he dislocated his shoulder early against , requiring a full reconstruction.

In February 2019, Wines was announced as one of the club's first-ever co-captains, alongside Tom Jonas. While traditionally the club's captain would wear the no. 1 guernsey during their captaincy, because there was more than one captain, the no. 1 guernsey was retired, and Wines retained his no. 16 guernsey. Wines was made vice-captain in 2020, with Jonas assuming sole responsibility for the captaincy.

Wines endured a frustrating 2019 season, with an injury-interrupted pre-season occurred due to a shoulder operation as a result of a waterskiing incident over the Australia Day weekend. 
He returned from his shoulder injury in Round 3 of the 2019 AFL season with 19 disposals and a goal against the Brisbane Lions. Following a fracture in his fibula against the Pies in Round 7, Wines missed a further 7 games and returned in Round 14 to play another 3 in a row. He managed to play 12 games in 2019 and averaged 24.7 disposals. His 2021 season was outstanding, leading to him being awarded the 2021 Brownlow medal.

Statistics
Statistics are correct to the end of the 2021 season.

|-  
| scope="row" text-align:center | 2013
| 
| 16 || 24 || 8 || 10 || 215 || 236 || 451 || 80 || 93 || 0.3 || 0.4 || 9.0 || 9.8 || 18.8 || 3.3 || 3.9 || 1
|-
| scope="row" text-align:center | 2014
| 
| 16 || 25 || 14 || 13 || 251 || 358 || 609 || 71 || 124 || 0.6 || 0.5 || 10.0 || 14.3 || 24.4 || 2.8 || 5.0 || 5
|-  
| scope="row" text-align:center | 2015
| 
| 16 || 13 || 4 || 2 || 149 || 169 || 318 || 23 || 56 || 0.3 || 0.2 || 11.5 || 13.0 || 24.5 || 2.7 || 5.2 || 6
|-
| scope="row" text-align:center | 2016
| 
| 16 || 22 || 11 || 13 || 262 || 314 || 576 || 63 || 128 || 0.5 || 0.6 || 11.9 || 14.3 || 26.2 || 2.9 || 5.8 || 11
|-  
| scope="row" text-align:center | 2017
| 
| 16 || 23 || 15 || 16 || 284 || 344 || 628 || 79 || 117 || 0.7 || 0.7 || 12.3 || 15.0 || 27.3 || 3.4 || 5.1 || 18
|-
| scope="row" text-align:center | 2018
| 
| 16 || 22 || 4 || 9 || 269 || 305 || 574 || 72 || 111 || 0.2 || 0.4 || 12.2 || 13.9 || 26.1 || 3.3 || 5.0 || 14
|- 
| scope="row" text-align:center | 2019
| 
| 16 || 12 || 7 || 4 || 135 || 168 || 303 || 41 || 59 || 0.6 || 0.3 || 11.3 || 14.0 || 25.3 || 3.4 || 4.9 || 6
|- 
! scope="row" style="text-align:center" | 2020
|
|16
|17
|8
|5
|177
|194
|371
|30
|64
|0.5
|0.3
|10.4
|11.4
|21.8
|1.8
|3.8
|10
|- 
! scope="row" style="text-align:center" | 2021
|
| 16 || 24 || 10 || 15 || 362 || 415 || 777 || 100 || 105 || 0.4 || 0.6 || 15.1 || 17.3 || 32.4 || 4.2 || 4.4 || bgcolor=98FB98 | 36±
|- 
| scope="row" text-align:center | 2022
| 
| 16 || 21 || 6 || 11 || 264 || 332 || 596 || 84 || 84 || 0.3 || 0.5 || 12.6 || 15.8 || 28.4 || 4.0 || 4.0 || 13
|- class="sortbottom"
! colspan="3" | Career
! 203
! 87
! 98
! 2368
! 2835
! 5203
! 655
! 953
! 0.4
! 0.5
! 11.7
! 14.0
! 25.6
! 3.2
! 4.7
! 120
|}

Notes

Honours and achievements
Individual
 Port Adelaide co-captain: 2019
 3× Gavin Wanganeen Medal: 2013, 2014, 2015
 3× 22under22 team: 2015, 2016, 2017
 AFL Rising Star nominee: 2013
 All Australian: 2021
 Brownlow Medal: 2021

References

External links

 
 

1994 births
Brownlow Medal winners
Australian rules footballers from Victoria (Australia)
Bendigo Pioneers players
Living people
People from Echuca
Port Adelaide Football Club players
Port Adelaide Football Club players (all competitions)